Columbus Municipal Airport  is a mile (2 km) northeast of Columbus, in Platte County, Nebraska. It is owned by the Columbus Airport Authority;  it has 100LL and JetA fuel for sale.

The first airline flights were Mid-West Airlines Cessna 190s in 1950–51. Frontier DC-3s arrived in 1965; its last Convair 580 left in 1979.

Facilities
In the year ending August 24, 2007 the airport had 15,000 aircraft operations, average 41 per day: 97% general aviation, 3% air taxi and <1% military.

References

External links 

Airports in Nebraska
Buildings and structures in Platte County, Nebraska
Former Essential Air Service airports